Craig-y-llyn is a subsidiary summit of Cadair Idris in the Snowdonia National Park, in Gwynedd, northwest Wales. It lies at the western end of the long Cadair Idris ridge. Its north-facing cwm houses the small glacial lake, Llyn Cyri. The southern flanks have gentle slopes, while the northern are very steep and contain broken crags.

The summit is grassy and marked by a few stones. It is often climbed in combination with Tyrrau Mawr.

References

External links
www.geograph.co.uk : photos of and from Cadair Idris

Arthog
Llanfihangel-y-Pennant
Mountains and hills of Gwynedd
Mountains and hills of Snowdonia
Hewitts of Wales
Nuttalls